Yang Liwei (born 2 January 1995) is a Chinese basketball player for the Los Angeles Sparks of the Women's National Basketball Association (WNBA) and for Inner Mongolia Women's Basketball Team and the Chinese national team, where she participated at the 2014 FIBA World Championship.

References

External links

1995 births
Living people
Chinese women's basketball players
Point guards
Basketball players from Yunnan
Sportspeople from Kunming
Guangdong Vermilion Birds players
Asian Games medalists in basketball
Basketball players at the 2018 Asian Games
Asian Games gold medalists for China
Medalists at the 2018 Asian Games
Basketball players at the 2020 Summer Olympics
Olympic basketball players of China